Puelo may refer to:
Puelo Lake, a lake in Chubut Province, Argentina
Puelo River, a river in Los Lagos Region, Chile